Steirachne is a genus of South American plants in the grass family.

 Species
 Steirachne barbata (Trin.) Renvoize - Brazil (Bahia, Goiás, Mato Grosso, Pará, Minas Gerais), Guyana (Rupununi), Venezuela (Guárico, Apure, Bolívar)
 Steirachne diandra Ekman - Brazil (Pará, Ceará, Rio Grande do Norte, Maranhão), Venezuela (Guárico, Apure, Bolívar)

References

Chloridoideae
Poaceae genera
Flora of South America
Taxa named by Erik Leonard Ekman